The 2013 South Asian Football Federation Championship, commonly referred to as 2013 SAFF Championship, was the 10th SAFF Championship for men's national football teams organized by the South Asian Football Federation (SAFF). The tournament took place from 31 August to 11 September 2013, and was hosted by Nepal for the second time, with the previous being in 1997.

Host selection 
Nepal were selected as hosts in September 2012 during the 2012 SAFF Women's Championship in Sri Lanka.

Broadcasting
The tournament was broadcast live in Nepal on Kantipur Television Network, Tolo TV in Afghanistan and Television Maldives in Maldives. Every match was broadcast live on YouTube.

Participating nations
Along with the hosts, the other seven nations from the South Asian region participated in the tournament. India came into the tournament as the reigning champions from the 2011 edition.

Group Draw
The draw ceremony took place on 30 July 2013 at Kathmandu's Soaltee Crowne Plaza was attended by a host of dignitaries including All Nepal Football Association (ANFA) Chairman Ganesh Thapa, SAFF President Kazi Salahuddin, Secretary Alberto Colaco and National Sports Council Member-Secretary Yubaraj Lama.

Venues

Squads

Match officials
On 22 August 2013, SAFF announced the 15 referees for the tournament. 

Referees

  Tayeb Shamsuzzaman
  Pratap Singh
  Adham Makhadmeh
  Sudish Pandey
  Saleh Al Hethlol
  Hettikamkanamge Perera

Assistant referees

  Shirzad Alimaqa
  Ugyen Dorji
  Ahmad Al Roalle
  Issa Al Amawe
  Ahmed Ameez
  Naniram Thapa Magar
  Murad Waheed
  Abdulaziz Al Asmari
  Khalid Al Doghairi

Group stage
SAFF confirmed the groups and schedule on 30 July 2013. 

All times listed are Nepali Standard Time.

Group A

Group B

Knockout stage

Bracket

Semi-finals

Final

Champion

Awards
The following awards were given for the 2013 SAFF Championship.

Team of the tournament 
The team was appointed by Sportskeeda:

Prize money
The prize money given to the top four teams:

Goalscorers
10 goals
 Ali Ashfaq

4 goals
 Mohamed Izzadeen

3 goals
 Ali Fasir

2 goals

 Sandjar Ahmadi
 Zohib Islam Amiri
 Mustafa Azadzoy
 Hashmatullah Barakzai
 Passang Tshering
 Ali Umar
 Anil Gurung

1 goal

 Mohammad Rafi Barakzai
 Jahid Hasan Ameli
 Atiqur Rahman Meshu
 Chencho Gyeltshen
 Sonam Tenzin
 Sunil Chhetri
 Arnab Mondal
 Syed Nabi
 Assadhulla Abdulla
 Hassan Adhuham
 Mohammad Umair
 Bharat Khawas
 Bimal Magar
 Ju Manu Rai
 Hassan Bashir
 Samar Ishaq
 Kalim Ullah
 Mohamed Fazaluzzaman

1 own goal

 Pema Dorji (playing against Sri Lanka)
 Samar Ishaq (playing against India)

References

External links
Official website
Official Youtube Channel

      
SAFF Championship
Sport in Kathmandu
International association football competitions hosted by Nepal
Football competitions in Nepal
2013 in Asian football
2013